Georgina Póta (born 13 January 1985 in Budapest) is a multiple European Champion table tennis player from Hungary.

Career

Póta was born in the Hungarian capital Budapest in 1985 and began practicing table tennis in 1990. Between 1994 and 2008 she played for Statisztika PSC in Hungary, subsequently  she moved to TTC Berlin Eastside.

For 1998 she already played in the Hungarian Top 12 and also participated at the Table Tennis European Youth Championships in Norcia, Italy, where she finished runner-up in the Girls' Cadet Doubles with Ildikó Csernyik. A year later she celebrated her first European Championship title after winning the Cadet Mixed Doubles event on the side of Dániel Zwickl. This was followed by other medals in the coming years, including three golds in the Junior category (women's doubles, team – 2001, Terni; women's singles – 2002, Moscow).

Her first major senior success came in 2007, when she won gold medal in the team competition at the Table Tennis European Championships in Belgrade. Additionally, she collected a silver medal in women's doubles and a bronze medal in mixed doubles. In the next year she won another gold at the 2008 Table Tennis European Championships, this time in doubles with Krisztina Tóth. In the team event she came second with Hungary.

She also competed at the Beijing 2008 Summer Olympics, where she was knocked out in the third round by Wang Nan of China who later managed to win the silver medal. Four years later at the 2012 Summer Olympics in London she was given bye in the first round due to her seeding and entered the competition in the second round against Tian Yuan. She beat her Croatian opponent 4–1, just to fell short against Park Mi-young with the same scoreline in the best of 32.

In 2014 she won both the German national cup and championship with TTC Berlin Eastside and also went triumphant in the European Champions League.

Awards
 Hungarian Table Tennis Player of the Year: 2004, 2012, 2013
 Junior Prima Award: 2007

See also
List of table tennis players

References

External links
 

1985 births
Living people
Table tennis players from Budapest
Hungarian female table tennis players
Olympic table tennis players of Hungary
Table tennis players at the 2008 Summer Olympics
Table tennis players at the 2012 Summer Olympics
Table tennis players at the 2016 Summer Olympics
Hungarian expatriate sportspeople in Germany
European Games competitors for Hungary
Table tennis players at the 2015 European Games
Table tennis players at the 2019 European Games
Table tennis players at the 2020 Summer Olympics